Ffestiniog Memorial Hospital is a health facility in Blaenau Ffestiniog, Gwynedd, Wales. It is managed by the Betsi Cadwaladr University Health Board.

History
The facility, which was designed by Clough Williams-Ellis, was officially opened by Colonel David Davies MP as the Festiniog and District Heroes Memorial Hospital in 1927. It was intended to commemorate local soldiers who had died in the First World War. After joining the National Health Service in 1948, it developed as a community hospital but, after inpatient services transferred to Ysbyty Alltwen in Tremadog, it closed to inpatients in March 2013. It then re-opened as the Canolfan Goffa Ffestiniog (English: Ffestiniog Memorial Centre) in November 2017.

References

Hospitals in Gwynedd
Hospitals established in 1927
1927 establishments in Wales
Hospital buildings completed in 1927
NHS hospitals in Wales